Captain H.H. Maharana Raj Shri Sir Amarsinhji Banesinhji Sahib   (4 January 1879 – 25 June 1954) was the last Maharana Raj Sahib of Wankaner belonging to Jhala dynasty, who ascended the throne of princely state of Wankaner on 12 June 1881 and ruled until his state was merged into India on 15 February 1948. He continued to be officially Maharana Sahib of Wankaner till his death on 28 June 1954. 

He was installed on the throne upon the death of his father Maharana Banesinhji Jaswantsinhji on 25 June 1881 at age of two years, and the State was placed under administration of government. He joined Rajkumar College, Rajkot for education. After his education was complete, he was given rein of State on 18 March 1889.

He served during the Great War with the Kathiawar Motor Ambulance Corps 1915-1916. A well-educated and progressive ruler, he took an interest in improving the welfare of his subjects. He established the first Farmers' Co-operative Bank in Saurashtra to provide finance to farmers, promoted agriculture, as well as the dairy and textile industries. He also introduced village self-government schemes, the first pensions for state employees, reformed the public services and a strong and effective police force.

A gifted sportsmen, he excelled in badminton, cricket and marksmanship. He also took an interest in motoring, aircraft and architecture, building several palaces and public buildings in Wankaner and Wankaner House in Bombay. He celebrated his Golden Jubilee on 31 May 1931.

He signed the treaty of accession and merged his State with Union of India forming part of United State of Kathiawar on 15 February 1948.

In 1951, a cotton textile mill at Wankaner, named Shree Amarsinhji Mills Limited, named after him was founded by his son Pratapsinhji Jhala, which, however, has now been taken over by Kores India in 1980. His grandson, Digvijaysinh Jhala continues to serve the company as a director.

His eldest son Pratapsinhji Amarsinhji succeeded to the title of Maharana of Wankaner upon his death on 28 June 1954.

Honours
Delhi Durbar Gold Medal – 1903 and 1911
Knight Commander of the Order of the Indian Empire (KCIE) - 1911
1914–15 Star - 1918
British War Medal -1918
Allied Victory Medal - 1918
King George V Silver Jubilee Medal – 1935
Knight Commander of the Order of the Star of India (KCSI) – 1936
King George VI Coronation Medal – 1937
Indian Independence Medal – 1947

References

1879 births
1954 deaths
Knights Commander of the Order of the Indian Empire
Knights Commander of the Order of the Star of India
Indian royalty
People from Rajkot district
Gujarati people
Indian Army personnel of World War I
Indian businesspeople in textiles
Maharajas of Wankaner